"The Cleansing" is the second single by In Case of Fire, and is the only  song that has entered a radio chart to date. "The Cleansing" was also made available on a 7" vinyl picture disk, limited to 1000 copies. The music video was shot in Leeds.

The Cleansing will be re-released on 26 October with 2 new exclusive b-sides.

Track listing
CD:

 The Cleansing – 3:34
 Faust – 2:02

Digital download:

 The Cleansing – 3:34
 The Cleansing (Live Session 4/12/08)
 Faust – 2:02
 A Terrible Fate – 2:49

Chart performance

Personnel
 Steven Robinson – Vocals, Guitar
 Mark Williamson – Bass guitar
 Colin Robinson – Drums, Percussion

References

External links
 The Cleansing - official video The Cleansing - behind the scenes

2009 singles
2009 songs
In Case of Fire songs
Song recordings produced by Gil Norton